Marlon Renato Sequen Suruy (born 23 June 1993) is a Guatemalan footballer who plays for Municipal in Guatemala and is a member of the Guatemala national team.

Club career
Born in Guatemala City, Sequen, who plays as a central midfielder, joined his local side, Municipal as a youth at just 8 years old.  He made his professional debut in 2011 at 18 years old. and became a regular starter during the 2013 Apertura.

International career
Sequen has represented Guatemala at the U17, U20, U21, U23 and Senior level.  He earned his first cap for the Guatemalan senior national team on 11 June 2013 in a 0–0 tie with Belize.

References

1993 births
Living people
Sportspeople from Guatemala City
Guatemalan footballers
Guatemala international footballers
C.S.D. Municipal players
Association football midfielders